Complete results for Men's Super Combined competition at the 2011 World Championships. It ran on February 14 at 10:00 local time (downhill) and 14:00 local time (slalom), the sixth race of the championships. 41 athletes from 18 countries competed.

Results

References

Super combined, men's